Eargasm is an album by the American R&B singer Johnnie Taylor, released in March 1976 on Columbia Records. The album contains "Disco Lady", which was a No. 1 pop hit for four weeks, and achieved the first platinum certification for a single, with two million copies sold. Eargasm was Taylor's first album for Columbia Records, after many years spent recording for Stax.

The album peaked at No. 5 on the Billboard 200; it spent two weeks at No. 1 on the Soul Albums chart, and peaked at No. 41 in Canada. Taylor's most commercially successful album, Eargasm achieved gold status in 1980 and platinum status in 2001. The album's second single, "Somebody's Gettin' It", was also a hit.

The album helped Taylor earn the Southern Christian Leadership Conference's award for the 1976 "Entertainer of the Year".

Production and marketing
The album was produced by Don Davis. Recorded in Dallas and Memphis, the backing musicians included Bernie Worrell and Bootsy Collins.

The scholar Houston Baker contends that "Disco Lady" was among the first R&B singles to be advertised to white record buyers; this was part of a 1970s practice of major labels signing veteran black musicians, and then focusing on crossover hits rather than career growth.

Critical reception

Robert Christgau thought that "Taylor's commitment to the traditional soul style remains unimpeachable even when he accedes to material as modish as the likable but lightweight 'Disco Lady'."

AllMusic deemed "Disco Lady" "the song of year", writing that "the rest of the album was standard soul, but this was overlooked in the rush". The Rolling Stone Album Guide determined that "the songwriting is nowhere near as punchy or pointed as on the Stax records; however, Taylor throws down some heavy gospel-style testimony."

The Dallas Observer, reviewing the album's 1999 rerelease on compact disc, called it "a wonderful record ... full of la-de-de, la-da-dum-da choruses and it-don't-hurt-me verses; the man could sing about infidelity and made it signify even among the most faithful." The Fort Worth Star-Telegram concluded that "Taylor had the good sense to mix strings with the sort of horn-based soul that made him a star on Stax in the '60s and come up with a Memphis/Detroit/Philadelphia hybrid." Music Week wrote that "the album is full of classy urban ballads and tidy midtempo grooves, with only 'It Don't Hurt Me Like It Used To' in true disco tempo."

Track listing

Personnel
Johnnie Taylor – lead vocals
Bruce Nazarian, Don Davis, Emmett Smith, Glen Goins, Jimmy Johnson – guitar
David Hood, Michael Henderson, Bootsy Collins – bass
Barry Beckett, Bernie Worrell, George Rountree, Melvin Griffin, Rudy Robinson – keyboards
Jerry Jones, Richard "Pistol" Allen, Roger Hawkins, Zachary Slatter – drums
Carl Austin and the Detroit Fisher Theatre Strings – strings, horns
Eli Fontaine – alto saxophone
Brandye – backing vocals
Bobby Eaton – backing vocals arrangements
Bernie Worrell, David Van De Pitte, Don Davis, Wade Marcus, Rudy Robinson, Sonny Sanders – arrangements

Charts

References

1976 albums
albums produced by Don Davis (record producer)
Columbia Records albums
albums arranged by Wade Marcus